The Men's team pursuit was held on 21 October 2011 with 13 teams participating.

Medalists

Results

Qualifying
Fastest 2 teams race for gold and 3rd and 4th teams race for bronze. It was held at 14:10.

Finals
The final was held at 20:15.

References

2011 European Track Championships
European Track Championships – Men's team pursuit